Cherry Thin (born 1 January 1996) is a Burmese singer. She became popular after competing in a Myanmar singing contest, Eain Mat Sone Yar (Yar Thet Pan) season 5 and releasing her single song Khwint Lut Pay Pho Taung Pan Chin, spending weeks at number 1 on Joox's Myanmar top 100 chart.

Early life 
Cherry Thin was born on 1 January 1996 in Natmauk, Magway Region, Myanmar.

Career
In 2017, she competed in the Eapmet Sone Yar (Yar Thet Pan) during season 5. In the same year, she released her debut single song Khwint Lut Pay Pho Taung Pan Chin, increasing her popularity. Her song Khwint Lut Pay Pho Taung Pan Chin has placed as number 1 on Joox's top 100 chart.

In 2019, her song Khwint Lut Pay Pho Taung Pan Chin won Female Singer Award of Most Requested Song from Shwe FM Facebook Page for 2019 in Shwe FM 10th Anniversary. In 2020, her single song Ma Loh Pal Khaw was released and became popular among audiences. It also reached number 1 on Joox's top 100 chart.  The song Ma Loh Pal Khaw also placed in the Top 10 Once in the Myanmar [Burma] Top 40 Chart.

On 25 September 2020, she sang the song Mone Mone May May at the 100th Anniversary of Burmese Film music concert.

On January 22, 2021, she sang the song "A Chit Sone Moht Pyaw Pya Chin Par Tal" at the music concert held in celebration of the 75th Anniversary of MRTV.

Discography

Single
Khwint Lut Pay Pho Taung Pan Chin (2017)
Ma Loh Pal Khaw (2020)
Thati Htar (2020)
Chit Yat Nae Chit Thu (2019)
A Sin Pway Pho Khat Thal with Min Khant (2020)
Poe Soe Pat Sat A Thae Kwae Nay The (2019)
Swae Nay Pyi (2020)
Yee Sar Lay Pae Lo Tal (2020)
A Thal Kwae Yan Ma Shi (2019)
A Chain Tway Ku Sar Thwar Lain Mal (2019)
Kyway Pyi Lay Icezz with Po Po and L Zartar Kyi Phyu (2020)
Ma Yone Ye Bu with Thar Thar (2019)
A Wedding Day with Zay Naing and Htet Hlyan Hmue (2019)

Award
Female Singer Award of Most Requested Song from Shwe FM Facebook Page for 2019 (Shwe FM 10th Anniversary)

References

External links

1996 births
Living people
People from Magway Division
21st-century Burmese women singers